Juan Manuel Solano Vanegas (born 22 July 1993) is a Colombian professional footballer who plays as a midfielder

Clubs
 Bogotá FC 2010–2012
 Boyacá Chicó 2013
 Cortuluá 2013–2015
 Barnechea 2015–2016

References
 
 

1993 births
Living people
Colombian footballers
Association football midfielders
Primera B de Chile players
Boyacá Chicó F.C. footballers
Bogotá FC footballers
Cortuluá footballers
A.C. Barnechea footballers
Colombian expatriate footballers
Colombian expatriate sportspeople in Chile
Expatriate footballers in Chile